Benjamín Muñoz Gamero (Mendoza, Argentina, March 31, 1817 – Punta Arenas, Chile, December 3, 1851) was a Chilean naval officer, senator and governor of Punta Arenas in the Straits of Magellan. He was killed during the Mutiny of Cambiazo in 1851.

Muñoz Gamero Peninsula is named after him.

See also
Bernhard Eunom Philippi

Sources
 Castillo Infante, Fernando; Cortés, Lia and Fuentes, Jordi (1996). Diccionario Histórico y Biográfico de Chile. Editorial Zig-Zag, Santiago de Chile, pp. 331–332.

Chilean Navy officers
1817 births
1851 deaths
Chilean Navy personnel of the War of the Confederation
People of the 1851 Chilean Revolution
19th-century Chilean Navy personnel
People from Mendoza, Argentina
Governors of Magallanes
Chilean people of Basque descent
Argentine people of Basque descent 
Chilean people of Spanish descent